The Chadwa are a Muslim community found in the states of Rajasthan and Gujarat in India.

History and origin

The Chadwa are known for their skills and proficiency in dyeing cloths in a specific style known as chadwi. It is one of the famous handicrafts of Rajasthan. The community claim to have originated from Multan in Pakistan. They are said to have settled initially in Nagaur, and then moved to Ajmer. A section of the community also moved to Rajkot and Ahmedabad in Gujarat. The Chadwa are now found mainly in Rajasthan in the districts of Nagaur, Pali, Bikaner Ajmer and Jodhpur. They still Seraiki, although most Chadwa also speak Marwari and Gujarati.

Present Circumstances

The Chadwa consists of a number of clans, the main ones being the Ghadila, Chaila, Suvarn, Sappal, Bagiti, Dharn, Maavothi (Marothi), Gulattar, Bhambhar, Penti and sunara.Reshamwala. Each of these clans are endogamous. They are Tabligi jamat Sunni Muslims, belonging mainly to the Barelvi sub-sect.

The Chadwa still depend on their traditional craft, and in addition, are also involved in dyeing. Other Chadwa are also involved in petty trade.

References

Social groups of Rajasthan
Muslim communities of India
Social groups of Gujarat
Muslim communities of Gujarat
Social groups of Pakistan
Muslim communities of Rajasthan